The Second Corps of Discovery: 1811 Journal of the Jackson and Clark Expeditionary Force is a 2011 alternative history novel written by F. Scott Key and translated by Matsu Ri. It is presented in a chronicle format from the daily journal of F. Scott Key, who documented his involvement with the Expedition from 1811 to 1812. The story depicts a follow-up attempt to reach the Pacific Coast, after the original Lewis and Clark Expedition was considered lost. Many true historical events and characters are used as the basis for the story.

Plot summary
By 1811 the First Corps of Discovery under Captain Lewis and Lieutenant Clark has been considered lost for 5 years. Any country that attempted to map the Pacific Coast by land or sea routes has completely failed. The United States of America has yet to press its claims for the Louisiana Purchase. President James Madison fears a British invasion, with the support of a unified Indian nation under Tecumseh, that would claim the Northwest Territories and cause a dissolution of the Union. Under these dire threats, a second Corps of Discovery is formed as a military expedition to reach the West Coast. Its primary goals are to learn what happened to Lewis and Clark and the first Corps members, and find the mythical "all-water route" across North America. However, there are several other secret missions and secondary objectives to the Expedition that are disclosed during the journey. Brigadier General George Rogers Clark, brother of Lieutenant William Clark and the original choice of President Thomas Jefferson, commands the new group. Supporting him are two other military men and Indian fighters, Colonel Andrew Jackson and Doctor William Henry Harrison. While primarily an army operation, Second Corps is required to do a great deal of scientific and diplomatic work. This explains the nature and skills of the members recruited for the journey, and the advanced prototype technology they use. The F. Scott Key Journal is heavily interlaced with Christian themes due his religious background. The continental crossing often resembles a detective story, as mysteries are unexpectedly revealed, based on conflicting rumors attributed to British and Spanish efforts of deception. These involve the belief that some unknown native civilization occupies areas of the Pacific Coast, perhaps Inca or Aztec tribes that escaped the Spanish Conquistadors and remained isolated to protect themselves against further invasions. Many of the historical characters in the story fulfill their actual destiny, but in an alternative environment. F. Scott Key was a part of the Expedition for a longer period of time, but his surviving account only covers his last year. This unbroken daily record details a complete story and is a major segment of the overall adventure. His manuscript was written originally in English, but translated into a foreign dialect. This additional premise supports ulterior plot elements.

Historical figures as fictional characters
The following individuals were major characters, minor characters, or mentioned in reference to a vital part of the story.

United States
 Francis Scott Key
 Colonel Andrew Jackson
 Doctor William Henry Harrison
 Captain Stephen Stillwell - Great-Grandfather of General Joseph Stilwell
 Lieutenant John M. James - Grandfather of Jesse Woodson James
 Sergeant Fletcher Pershing - Great-Grandfather of General John Joseph Pershing
 Sergeant Charles R. Sherman - Father of William Tecumseh Sherman
 Quirin P. Hohlweck - Grandfather of Civil War Historian Philip John Hohlweck
 Captain Meriwether Lewis
 Lieutenant William Clark
 President Thomas Jefferson
 President James Madison
 John Jacob Astor
 Major Steven Long
 Lieutenant Zebulon Pike

France
 François Péron
 Pierre Mallet
 Paul Mallet

Prussia and the German states
 Corporal Christian Schramm - Great-Grandfather of diplomat Henri Schramm
 Johann Friedrich Blumenbach

United Kingdom
 Captain James Cook
 Captain Robert Gray
 Sir Francis Drake
 Sir Alexander MacKenzie
 Captain John Meares

Spain
 Saint Francis Xavier
 Sebastián Vizcaíno
 Francisco Vásquez de Coronado
 Juan Manuel de Ayala
 Bruno de Heceta
 Hernán Cortés
 King Charles V

Portugal
 Father Alessandro Fróis - Descendant of Luís Fróis

Shawnee Tribe
 Tecumseh
 Tenskwatawa

Manda Tribe
 Shahaka

Papal State
 Pope Gregory XV
 Pope Urban VIII

Nippon / Kashū
 Matsukura Tatsuya - Descendant of Matsukura Shigemasa and Matsukura Katsuie
 Masuda IV Sei Taishōgun - Descendant of Amakusa Shirō
 Yokozawa Daifu - Descendant of Yokozawa Shogen
 Shimazu Tadatsune
 Hasekura Rokuemon Tsunenaga
 Date Masamune

Historical facts as fictional events
Major elements of the plot were based on the following documented occurrences.

 Great Comet of 1811
 1811–12 New Madrid earthquakes
 Treaty of Tordesillas
 Louisiana Purchase
 Lewis and Clark Expedition

Famous landmarks as fictional locations
The setting of specific places used the following geographic areas.

 Missouri River
 Colonial America
 New Spain
 Alcatraz Island
 Santa Catalina Island

References

External links 
Official Online Journal

American alternate history novels
2011 American novels
Fiction set in 1811